A disabled parking permit, also known as a disabled badge, disabled placard, handicapped permit, handicapped placard, handicapped tag, and "Blue Badge" in the European Union, is a permit that is displayed upon parking a vehicle. It gives the operator of a vehicle permission to special privileges regarding the parking of that vehicle. These privileges include parking in a space reserved for persons with disabilities, or, in some situations, permission to park in a time-limited space for a longer time, or to park at a meter without payment.

Reciprocal recognition 
Member Countries of the International Transport Forum, an inter-governmental organisation within the OECD, would from 1978 grant the same parking concessions to people with disabilities as they offered their own nationals. 

The Resolution was updated and extended in 1997 by "Resolution no. 97/4 on Reciprocal Recognition of Parking Badges for Persons with Mobility Handicaps", and now applies to ITF member states as well as Associated Countries. The condition is the display of a badge showing the international wheelchair symbol. 

The International Transport Forum was called the European Conference of Ministers of Transport (ECMT) between 1953 and 2007.

America

United States

In the United States, reserved spaces are mandated by the Americans with Disabilities Act Accessibility Guidelines. Disabled parking permits generally take the form of either specially marked license plates or a placard that hangs from the rear-view mirror. Plates are generally used for disabled drivers on their personal vehicle, while the portable disability placard can be moved from one vehicle to another with the disabled person, both when driving or when riding with another driver.

The medical requirements to obtain a permit vary by state, but are usually confined to specific types of disabilities or conditions. These as a general rule include the use of any assistive device such as a wheelchair, crutches, or cane, as well as a missing leg or foot. Some states also include certain cardiovascular, pain, or respiratory conditions. About half of US states (26) include blindness as a qualifying disability enabling the person to obtain a disability parking permit for use as a passenger, and 14 states include a disabled hand as a qualifying disability. Four states include deafness (Georgia, Kentucky, Virginia, Wyoming), and two states (Virginia and New York) include mental illness or developmental disabilities as qualifying disabilities.

Europe

European Union / European Economic Area 

In the European Union (EU), a disabled parking permit allows partial or total exemption from charges or penalties associated with the parking of a motor vehicle used by a badge-holder, and shows entitlement to use of dedicated parking bays and off-street parking (where they are provided). The concession extends in some places to partial or total exemption from tolls or general prohibitions on where a vehicle can be driven. Council recommendation 98/376/EC recommended that member states issue parking permits adhering to the standardised Community model, and that the permit should be recognized in other member states. The recommendation has since been amended by Council recommendation 2008/205/EC. The recommendations are extended to the European Economic Area (EEA) through incorporation into the EEA Agreement.Since 2000, all general disabled parking permits in the EU have been standardised to a common style and blue colour, leading to the officially-used designation "Blue Badge". A Blue Badge issued in one country of the EU is generally given equal recognition in others with various exceptions as described for the countries below.

The privileges vary by area, but some include parking in no parking zones, extended time limit on time-limited parking areas, waived parking fees, and using pedestrian areas in urgent situations.

United Kingdom
In the United Kingdom, this scheme of permits was originally introduced (using Orange Badges) by the Chronically Sick and Disabled Persons Act 1970. Badges are issued as a right if a person meets certain statutory requirements, most of which are associated with actually being in receipt of certain disability benefits from the national Social Security system; additionally, a local authority can make concessionary issues of badges to persons who have a permanent disability which does not fall directly within the more rigid statutory requirements but which seriously impairs their mobility.

General exceptions
The Great Britain Blue Badge scheme does not apply to parking away from public roads and local authority car parks, with the general concessions often not recognised at ports, airports and railway stations unless the operators have provided voluntary parking privileges.

Parking Maps
Until 2010 Directgov provided a service that covers country wide customised maps for Blue Badge Holders with different base colours reflecting councils policies on Blue Badge Holder's parking. In addition to council policies this service also pin pointed the location of different features specific to disabled community. There are a few dedicated Blue Badge sat-navs available, mainly from the specialist sat-nav company Navevo. See BBNav publicity for a likely list of integral features.

Since the cessation of the directgov service maps have been provided by online services such as the crowd-sourced BlueBadgeParking.com which also provides free Sat-nav downloads.

Some Local Authorities, may use their own information and resources to help provide information for Blue Badges users. Nottingham City uses a popular map base.

Misuse and Abuse
Misuse and Abuse of Blue Badges in the UK can incur fines of up to £1,000.

Between 01 April 2020 and 31 March 2021 prosecutions for misuse of the blue badge scheme were supported by specific or general policies in 74% of local authorities (110 authorities) in England. Of those without a policy, 50% are planning on implementing one in the future.

In England, there were 698 reported prosecutions in the year ending March 2021.
A drop of 49% in prosecuted badges may relate to the effects of the coronavirus (COVID-19) pandemic on citizen behaviour, local authority enforcement practices, and resources availability.

In England, 4,396 badges in the year ending March 2021 were reported to be lost or stolen. Of these, 76% were reported to be lost, and 24% were stolen.

England and Wales 
In England and Wales, Blue Badge holders are required (unless signs show otherwise) to display a Disabled Person's Parking Disc ("Clock"). When parking on yellow lines or in other places where there is a time restriction, a clock showing the time of arrival should be displayed. When parking on a no waiting restriction (yellow lines etc) a maximum of 3 hours is permitted.
The clock should be sent to together with the Blue Badge. If not, a clock can be obtained from the same council that issued the badge.

The time clock must be displayed on the vehicle’s dashboard or facia panel, so that the time can be seen clearly through the front windscreen. The clock should be set to show the quarter hour period during which the car was parked. If there is no dashboard or facia panel in the vehicle, the clock must still be displayed in a place where it can be clearly read from outside the vehicle.

Badge holders from elsewhere in the European Union will need to obtain a Clock (obtainable from their Issuing Office in the UK) to validate their badge otherwise the vehicle will be treated as if no badge were displayed.

Local differences in parking rules
In London, the volume of traffic has led to restrictions upon the national scheme in some areas with local colour schemes used to restrict standard concessions to local residents, for example the permits are green in Camden, white in Westminster, purple in Kensington and Chelsea, and red in the City of London. In these cities and boroughs special rules and parking spaces are provided for Blue Badge holders.

Similar local schemes operate in other large towns or cities in the UK, for example Norwich operates a 'green badge scheme'.

Northern Ireland
The standard scheme only generally applies to on-street parking and is outlined on the Roads Service Northern Ireland website. A "White Badge" is required for access to Pedestrian Zones.

Scotland 
In Scotland, a local authority Parking Attendant (in addition to police and traffic wardens) has the power to inspect a Blue Badge; failure to allow this inspection is an offence. There are also proposals to extend the issue of badges to small children and a wider range of (temporarily or permanently) disabled people.

Oceania

Australia
In Australia, disabled parking permits are provided under the Australian Disability Parking Scheme, which was established in September 2010 to harmonise disability permits across Australia. Disabled parking permits are applied for through state and territory organisations, and rules for eligibility differ among jurisdictions. If someone else parks in a disabled zone, they will be fined by either police or the council.

See also 
 Adapted automobile
Parking violation

References

External links

BlueBadgeParking.com—a worldwide, crowd-sourced map of disabled parking locations with SatNav downloads]
Federation Internationale de l'Automobile—information about disabled parking schemes around the world

Identifiers
Disability rights
Parking law
Vehicle registration plates